General elections were held in Islamabad Capital Territory on Wednesday, 16 November 1988 to elect 1 member of National Assembly of Pakistan from Islamabad.

Pakistan People's Party won Islamabad seat by 16,443 votes.

Candidates 
Total no of 15 Candidates including 8 Independents contested for 1 National Assembly Seat from Islamabad.

Result 

Party Wise

Constituency wise

References 

1988 elections in Pakistan
General elections in Pakistan